NetChoice, LLC v. Paxton is a lawsuit by trade association of technology and internet-based businesses challenging Texas House Bill 20 that forbade social media companies with more than 50 million users from censoring certain user content along with restricting ability of email providers to filter content except where illegal, obscene or contains malicious code.

NetChoice v. Paxton 
In September 2021, Texas passed H.B. 20, a law that would govern the behavior, particularly with regard to content moderation, of social media companies with more than 50 million users. Among other provisions, the law forbade platforms from "censoring" (defined as essentially any mechanism by which content is removed or hidden) user content based on viewpoint, barred email providers from impeding the transmission of emails under most circumstances (except where the content is obscene, illegal, or contains malicious code), and required platforms provide detailed transparency reports and information about their content moderation policies.

After the enactment of the bill, NetChoice and the Computer & Communications Industry Association sued Ken Paxton, the Attorney General of Texas, in federal court to block its implementation. On December 1, 2021, the federal district court granted a preliminary injunction enjoining the law's enforcement. The court ruled that the law was unconstitutional because editorial discretion, such as the moderation actions the law forbade, is protected by the First Amendment.

Texas appealed the district court's decision to grant an injunction, and in May of 2022, a panel of the Fifth Circuit Court of Appeals issued a one-sentence, unexplained order granting a stay of the injunction and allowing the law to take effect.

Two days after the appeals court issued its stay, NetChoice and CCIA petitioned the Supreme Court to vacate the stay and reinstate the district court's injunction. They argued that the Fifth Circuit's unreasoned order deprived them of "careful review and a meaningful decision" and that reinstating the district court's stay would preserve the status quo while the law's constitutionality continued to be litigated. On May 31, 2022, the Supreme Court vacated the Fifth Circuit's stay by a 5–4 vote, allowing the injunction to take effect once more. Justices Alito, Thomas, and Gorsuch dissented, writing that H.B. 20 was "novel" and that it was not clear how the court's precedent should apply in this case and that the Supreme Court should therefore not have intervened. Justice Kagan voted to deny the stay as well, but did not write to explain her decision.

On September 16, 2022, a panel of the Fifth Circuit ruled that the district court erred in issuing its injunction, saying that "[the platforms'] censorship is not speech", and remanded the case to the district court for further proceedings. The Fifth Circuit's ruling creates a circuit split with the Eleventh Circuit which, in May of 2022, largely upheld an injunction against a similar law enacted by Florida (and challenged by NetChoice).

NetChoice v. Moody

NetChoice v. Moody was filed by NetChoice in response to Florida SB 7072, which was signed into law by Governor Ron DeSantis in 2021 and imposed sweeping requirements on social-media providers.    A district judge granted a preliminary injunction, which was upheld on appeal.  The ACLU filed an amicus curiae brief:

NetChoice 
NetChoice is lobbying group for big tech, founded in 2001. Its many members include Amazon, AOL, Google, Meta, Ebay, Paypal, and Yahoo. Its lobbying expenditures were $180,000 in 2021 and $220,000 in 2022, as reported by OpenSecrets.  It hired former congressman and U.S. Securities and Exchange Commission Chairman Christoper Cox as lobbyist.

Primary case documents

References

External links 
 NetChoice's website

Trade associations based in the United States
Technology trade associations